Sirosporium diffusum is an ascomycete fungus that is a plant pathogen, infecting pecan.

References

External links 
 Index Fungorum
 USDA ARS Fungal Database

Fungal tree pathogens and diseases
Nut tree diseases
Ascomycota enigmatic taxa